Fresh Beat Band of Spies is an animated children's television series originally airing on Nickelodeon and the Nick Jr. Channel. It is a spin-off of Nickelodeon's live-action series The Fresh Beat Band. The show was created by Nadine van der Velde and Scott Kraft, and it was produced by Jeannine Hodson. Production took place at Nickelodeon Animation Studio and 6 Point Harness, both based in California.

20 episodes were made. The series first previewed on the Nick Jr. Channel on June 15, 2015, before premiering on the main Nickelodeon network on June 29.

Plot
The Fresh Beat Band, now a group of spies, solve wacky mysteries in their town using their individual talents and cool gadgets.

Characters

Main
 Kiki (voiced by Yvette Gonzalez-Nacer) is the band's lead guitarist and lead singer who owns a local hair salon. She has a jetpack and a scooter.
 Shout (voiced by Thomas Hobson) is the athletic keyboardist and leader of the spy team who is also the lifeguard at a nearby swimming pool. Whenever Reed sends the spies on a mission, Shout says "Time to spy it up!"
 Marina (voiced by Tara Perry) is the brainy drummer of the spy team who is the chemist for a cupcake bakery. Her catchphrase is "Brainstorm!" which she says whenever she has an idea.
 Twist (voiced by Jon Beavers) is the comedic disc jockey of the team whose day job is as the manager of the Pet Daycare Center. He uses a pogo stick as a vehicle.
 Bo Monkey (voiced by Tom Kenny) is Twist's best friend, a monkey who helps him operate the pet center. He does not speak, but communicates through monkey noises that reflect his emotions.
 Reed (voiced by Tom Kenny) is the team's "gadget guy" who wears glasses. He tends to suddenly appear out of nowhere, due to hiding in or behind various objects, which startles the other team members. He is the only recurring character from the original series to return.
 Commissioner Goldstar (voiced by Keith Silverstein) is the friendly but hapless chief of police. He appears after the spies complete their missions, usually to congratulate the team on their successes.

Recurring
 Lily (voiced by Heaven White) is Commissioner Goldstar's niece and a good friend of the Fresh Beats. She has a pet dog named Goldie and plays on Shout's baseball team.
 Lil Piggie is a pig with a hot pink mohawk and one of the many animals living at Twist's pet center. He is a friend of the Fresh Beats.
 Three Direction is a parody of the band One Direction.

Villains
 Champ Von Champ Von Winnerchamp (voiced by Tom Kenny) is a muscular recurring villain who steals and cheats for various objects, such as trophies, wrestling belts and party supplies. He speaks with a German accent and is assisted by his own cheer squad for stealing stuff.
 Captain Arrrgh (voiced by Tom Kenny) is a singing pirate who steals treasure with the help of his chicken, Poulet, and his second-in-command, First Mate.
 Yi-Haw (voiced by Kate Higgins) is a cowgirl and outlaw who hopes to surpass her outlaw ancestor by stealing buildings from all over town.
 Squee Z. Dumpkins (voiced by Tara Strong) is a famous internet celebrity known for her cuteness.

Production
The series was first announced in March 2014. In August of the same year, it was announced that Nickelodeon was currently in production on the show and it was slated for a 2015 release. From November 2014 until February 2015, several songs from Fresh Beat Band of Spies episodes were performed as part of "The Fresh Beat Band: Greatest Hits Live" tour; products such as posters and T-shirts featuring the cartoon Fresh Beat characters were sold at these concerts.

Episodes

Broadcast
Fresh Beat Band of Spies aired on both Nickelodeon and the Nick Jr. Channel in the United States. It previewed on the Nick Jr. Channel on June 15, 2015, before premiering on Nickelodeon on June 29. The first eleven episodes were put on Nickelodeon's schedule throughout late July 2015, but only the first four episodes ended up airing on the main network.

Internationally, the series was first shown on Nickelodeon Canada on September 1, 2015. It also aired on Treehouse TV. The series debuted on Nick Jr. in Germany, Austria, and Switzerland on January 11, 2016, in Italy on January 18, 2016, in the Middle East and North Africa on January 25, 2016, and in Australia on February 1, 2016. The series premiered on Nick Jr. UK on February 6, 2016.

Reception

Critical response
The series has received generally positive reviews from critics. Common Sense Media reviewer Emily Ashby gave the show four out of five stars, praising the show's use of "quirky villains" rather than "real scares." In October 2015, USA Today listed the series as one of the twenty-five best family programs of the year.

Accolades
The episode "Singing Pirate" was nominated for "Outstanding Achievement, Production Design in an Animated TV/Broadcast Production" in the 43rd Annie Awards. The series was also the recipient of a 2019 Parents' Choice Award.

References

External links
Official site

Fresh Beat Band of Spies on Amazon Video
Fresh Beat Band of Spies on TV Guide

2010s Nickelodeon original programming
2010s American animated television series
2010s American comic science fiction television series
2015 American television series debuts
2016 American television series endings
2010s Canadian animated television series
2010s Canadian comic science fiction television series
2015 Canadian television series debuts
2016 Canadian television series endings
American animated television spin-offs
American children's animated action television series
American children's animated adventure television series
American children's animated comic science fiction television series
American children's animated science fantasy television series
American children's animated musical television series
American children's animated mystery television series
American flash animated television series
American preschool education television series
Canadian animated television spin-offs
Canadian children's animated action television series
Canadian children's animated adventure television series
Canadian children's animated comic science fiction television series
Canadian children's animated science fantasy television series
Canadian children's animated musical television series
Canadian children's animated mystery television series
Canadian flash animated television series
Canadian preschool education television series
Animated preschool education television series
Anime-influenced Western animated television series
2010s preschool education television series
English-language television shows
Nick Jr. original programming
Television series by Nelvana